The tenth season of The Real Housewives of Orange County, an American reality television series, was broadcast on Bravo. It aired June 8, 2015 until November 12, 2015, and was primarily filmed in Orange County, California. Its executive producers are Adam Karpel, Alex Baskin, Douglas Ross, Gregory Stewart, Scott Dunlop, Stephanie Boyriven and Andy Cohen.

The Real Housewives of Orange County focuses on the lives of Vicki Gunvalson, Tamra Judge, Heather Dubrow, Shannon Beador and Meghan King Edmonds. It consisted of 24 episodes.

Production and crew
The renewal of the tenth season of The Real Housewives of Orange County was announced in January 2015. In May 2015, the official premier date, cast and trailer were revealed.
The season premiere "Under Construction" was aired on June 8, 2015, while the nineteenth episode "Baptism by Fire" served as the season finale, and was aired on October 12, 2015. It was followed by a three-part reunion that aired on October 19, October 26 and November 1, 2015, a "Brooks Tell All" special hosted by Andy Cohen and a "Secrets Revealed" episode, which both aired on November 12, 2015, which marked the conclusion of the season.
Adam Karpel, Alex Baskin, Douglas Ross, Gregory Stewart, Scott Dunlop, Stephanie Boyriven and Andy Cohen are recognized as the series' executive producers; it is produced and distributed by Evolution Media.

Cast and synopsis
All five wives featured on the ninth season returned for season ten, however Lizzie Rovsek returned in a recurring role and not full-time. Season nine's recurring cast member, Danielle Gregorio, departed the series and did not return for season ten.
Joining the series in the tenth season is Meghan King Edmonds, the third wife of baseball superstar Jim Edmonds. Edmonds is described as "sexy and opinionated" as well as a "blonde bombshell."

Shannon Beador deals with the revelation of her husband David's affair and the two go to counselling and work on their relationship with each other and their children. Beador also works to repair her broken relationships with Heather Dubrow and Tamra Judge.
Beador find herself in drama with newcomer Edmonds over an unwanted phone call.
Dubrow continues to take control of the new house being built  also releasing a sparkling wine named after her daughter, Colette. Dubrow feels disconnected and unappreciated by her husband Terry.
Judge and her husband Eddie decide to spend time away from working together to improve their relationship. Judge contributes financially to her son's move to Orange County upon learning of his wife's pregnancy however knowing Eddie would not approve she does so secretly. Sarah gives birth during the season making Judge a grandmother. Judge forms a new connection with her faith and later gets baptized.
Edmonds helps raise her step-daughter because her husband's former wife, LeAnn Edmonds Horton, is ill with cancer. Edmonds struggles with the idea of being too much of a parent or not enough and ending up as the friend. After filming while the season was airing, Horton lost her battle to cancer.
Vicki Gunvalson and her boyfriend Brooks Ayers deal with his diagnosis of cancer after he moves in with her. At Beador's house for a game night, Gunvalson receives news about the passing of her Mother and the wives gather around her to support her, including guest and former wife Jeana Keough. Gunvalson heads to Chicago to mourn with her family.

Throughout the season Ayers' cancer diagnosis and the integrity of it played a huge part. It all began when Judge arranged a lunch with her psychic who informs Judge, Dubrow and Edmonds that he doesn't believe Ayers is ill. Throughout the season accusations and speculations fly around Orange County causing all the women to be involved as well as Gunvalson's daughter Briana. Judge is forced to choose a side when her loyalty to Gunvalson is questioned, however Judge refuses to be made to look like a fool. The credibilities of Dubrow and her husband are put on the line when they are brought in to Ayers' alibi. 
Beador and Gunvalson's friendship breaks down when Beador's loyalty is questioned by Gunvalson even after Beador has supported the couple with Ayers' diagnosis.
Beador remains loyal until Gunvalson is caught speaking of Beador's marriage and the affair. Edmonds constantly questions what she believes is a lie. Edmonds has knowledge in the situation due to her husband's former wife is currently dying of cancer. Edmonds also endeavors to uncover the truth through research of clinics, phone calls and even contacting Ayers' ex-partners. Gunvalson publicly dresses down Edmonds when she learns of her actions; however, Edmonds is undeterred and continues investigating. Things come to a head in the final episode of the season, in which the ladies confront Gunvalson at Judge's baptism, and Gunvalson infamously compares the ladies' quest for the truth regarding Ayers to Jesus Christ's crucifixion. At the reunion concluding the series, Gunvalson reveals she doesn't believe Ayers has cancer and that she was lied to. Also during the reunion, Edmonds reveals that her husband's ex-wife, who was dying of cancer during the filming of the season, had since passed away. During the "Brooks Tells All" special hosted by Cohen, Ayers reveals he and Gunvalson are no longer together.

 Gunvalson's daughter, Briana appeared during the reunion. She was seated between her mother and Dubrow during her appearance.

Episodes

References

External links

 
 
 

2015 American television seasons
Orange County (season 10)